The Beica is a tributary of the river Olt in Romania. It joins the Olt through the Oporelu Canal, into which it flows near Arcești-Cot.

References

Rivers of Romania
Rivers of Vâlcea County
Rivers of Olt County